The karozzin is a Maltese traditional mode of transport consisting of a carriage pulled by a horse or pair of horses. It was once popular for general transit and is still used in ceremonies such as funerals, and as a tourist attraction. It is mostly found at Mdina and Valletta, and dates to the mid-nineteenth century.

References

Animal-powered vehicles
Carriages
Transport in Malta